Francisco de Matos Pereira Airport  is the airport serving Dourados, Brazil.

History
The airport was commissioned on November 13, 1982.

Between 1 May 2021 and 31 October 2021 and 1 March 2022 and 30 September 2022, the airport will be closed due to major renovation of the runway.

Airlines and destinations
No scheduled flights operate at this airport.

Access

See also

List of airports in Brazil

References

External links

Airports in Mato Grosso do Sul
Airports established in 1982
1982 establishments in Brazil